Hommelvik is the administrative centre of the municipality of Malvik in Trøndelag county, Norway. The village is located at the end of the Hommelvika, a bay off of the Trondheimsfjord. The river Homla runs north through the village, emptying into the fjord. The name of the village is derived from the river name.

Hommelvik Church is located in the village, just south of the shoreline. The European route E6 highway runs around the village and the Trøndelag Commuter Rail has a stop at Hommelvik Station.

References

External links

Villages in Trøndelag
Malvik